Manipuri mythology may refer to:
 Meitei mythology, mythology of the Meitei people, the predominant ethnic group of Manipur of Northeast India
 Mythology associated with Manipur (Mahabharata), in relation to the Mahabharata
 Mythological tales of any other indigenous ethnic groups of Manipur of Northeast India